Third Republic may refer to:

Governments
Sorted by continent. Ordered by year founded, then year collapsed, then alphabetical.

Africa
Third Republic of Uganda (1979–1986)
Third Republic of Ghana (1979–1993)
Third Republic in the history of Niger (1992–1996)
Third Nigerian Republic, planned for 1993, but never established
Third Republic of Madagascar (1993–2010)

Americas
Third Republic of Venezuela (1817–1819)
Third Dominican Republic (1924–1965)
Third Brazilian Republic (1937–1946)

Asia
Third Philippine Republic (1946–1972)
Third Republic of China (1949–1991)
Third Republic of Korea (1963–1972)
Third Cambodian Republic, also known as the "People's Republic of Kampuchea" (1979–1989)

Europe
French Third Republic (1870–1940)
Third Czechoslovak Republic (1945–1948)
Third Hellenic Republic of Greece, since 1974
Third Portuguese Republic, since 1974
Third Hungarian Republic, since 1989
Third Polish Republic, since 1989
Third Armenian Republic, since 1993

Other uses
Third Republic of Vietnam (1990–present), a South Vietnamese government in exile

See also

First Republic
Second Republic
Fourth Republic
Fifth Republic
Sixth Republic
Seventh Republic
Third Ukrainian Republic (disambiguation)